NHSC may refer to:

Canada
National Historic Sites of Canada—also simply called National Historic Sites

United Kingdom
NHS Connecting for Health

United States
New Hampshire Supreme Court
National Health Service Corps
National Home Study Council, now known as the Distance Education and Training Council